Mount Tsurugi may refer to:

 Mount Tsurugi (Hokkaido) (剣山), in Hokkaido, Japan
 Mount Tsurugi (Tokushima) (剣山), in Tokushima Prefecture, Japan
 Mount Tsurugi (Toyama) (剱岳), in Toyama Prefecture, Japan

See also
 Tsurugisan (train)